Rodrigo Escobar y Restrepo (1935–2009) was a Colombian botanist, and a leading specialist in orchids.

Publications

Books
  Escobar, Rodrigo . 1991. Native Orchids of Colombia. Ed Hill, Medellin. 6 vols.
 -----------  Jorge Mario Munera . 1994. Native Colombian Orchids: Maxillaria-Ponthieva. Volume 3 Native Colombian Orchids. 616 pp. Ed Hill. 
 Carlyle A. Luer , Rodrigo Escobar, Fritz Hamer, stig Dalström . 1994.  Dracularum Thesaurus: eine Monographie der Gattung Dracula, Volume 3. 78 pp. Ed Missouri Botanical Garden. 
  Carlyle A. Luer, Rodrigo Escobar . 1996.  Systematics of Restrepia (Orchidaceae). Volume 13 Icones Pleurothallidinarum. 168 pp. Ed Missouri Botanical Garden. 
  Calaway H. Dodson, Rodrigo Escobar . 2004. Native Ecuadorian Orchids'', Volume 1. Native Ecuadorian Orchids. Ed Hill.

References

External links

20th-century Colombian botanists
Colombian academics
Botanists with author abbreviations
1935 births
2009 deaths